The 2012 Delhi municipal corporation election was held on 15 April 2012 and the result was declared on 17 April 2012.

Schedule

Election results  
The votes were counted and result was declared on 17 April 2012.

References 

Local elections in Delhi
Delhi
2012 elections in India
2010s in Delhi